Nargona Palace is situated at Darbhanga in State of Bihar, India. This Palace was the last royal Brahmin palace to be built in Raj Darbhanga.

History 
The city of Darbhanga was one of the major cities to be destroyed in the 1934 Nepal–Bihar earthquake that rocked northern part of Bihar. Almost the entire city had been destroyed. The Palaces in Darbhanga also suffered major damage. Moti Mahal Palace was entirely destroyed in earthquake. Anand Bagh Palace and Ram Bag Palace were severely damaged and were rebuilt after the earthquake. Maharaja Kameshwar Singh of Darbhanga then decided to build a new Palace with the best  earthquake resistant technology available at that time. The Palace incorporated the best earthquake resistant features when built and its ability to withstand earthquake was demonstrated in 1988 when another earthquake rocked Bihar. It is probably the first building in India to incorporate earthquake resistant technology.

Architectural Style 
The palace is a simple looking building with no outstanding features. The thrust being on building's ability to withstand major earthquake, no unnecessary features to beautify the building were added. A first time visitor, expecting to see a beautiful looking Palace, would be greatly disappointed in looking at a plain but massive building.

Present Status 
The Palace along with its surrounding garden, orchards, etc. as well as Head Office building of Raj Darbhanga was donated in 1972 to Government of Bihar for establishing a university. Now Lalit Narayan Mithila University is beneficiary of donation and functions from these buildings.

References 
 

Palaces in Bihar
Darbhanga
Tourist attractions in Darbhanga district